First African Baptist Church is a historic church at 2621 9th Street in Tuscaloosa, Alabama.

It was built in 1907 from a congregation established in 1866, and was added to the National Register of Historic Places in 1988.

References

External links

Baptist churches in Alabama
Churches on the National Register of Historic Places in Alabama
Churches completed in 1907
Buildings and structures in Tuscaloosa, Alabama
National Register of Historic Places in Tuscaloosa County, Alabama
First African Baptist churches